David Oelhoffen (born 1968) is a French film director and screenwriter. His debut feature In Your Wake premiered in the International Critics' Week of the 2007 Cannes Film Festival. His next film was Far from Men from 2014, which is based on the short story The Guest by Albert Camus and stars Viggo Mortensen and Reda Kateb. It played in competition at the 71st Venice International Film Festival where it won three awards.

Filmography
 Le Mur (1996) – short film
 Big Bang (1997) – short film
 En mon absence (2001) – featurette
 Sous le bleu (2004) – short film
 In Your Wake (Nos retrouvailles) (2007)
 Far from Men (Loin des hommes) (2014)
 In the Forests of Siberia (Dans les forêts de Sibérie) (2016)
 Close Enemies (2018)

References

External links
 

1968 births
French film directors
French male screenwriters
French screenwriters
Living people